Neurasthenia (from the Ancient Greek νεῦρον neuron "nerve" and ἀσθενής asthenés "weak") is a term that was first used at least as early as 1829 for a mechanical weakness of the nerves and became a major diagnosis in North America during the late nineteenth and early twentieth centuries after neurologist George Miller Beard reintroduced the concept in 1869.

As a psychopathological term, the first to publish on neurasthenia was Michigan alienist E. H. Van Deusen of the Kalamazoo asylum in 1869, followed a few months later by New York neurologist George Beard, also in 1869, to denote a condition with symptoms of fatigue, anxiety, headache, heart palpitations, high blood pressure, neuralgia, and depressed mood. Van Deusen associated the condition with farm wives made sick by isolation and a lack of engaging activity, while Beard connected the condition to busy society women and overworked businessmen.

Neurasthenia was a diagnosis in the World Health Organization's ICD-10, but is no more diagnosed in ICD-11, marked as deprecated. It also is no longer included as a diagnosis in the American Psychiatric Association's Diagnostic and Statistical Manual of Mental Disorders. The condition is, however, described in the Chinese Society of Psychiatry's Chinese Classification of Mental Disorders.

Americans were said to be particularly prone to neurasthenia, which resulted in the nickname "Americanitis" (popularized by William James). Another, rarely used, term for neurasthenia is nervosism.

Symptoms
The condition was explained as being a result of exhaustion of the central nervous system's energy reserves, which Beard attributed to modern civilization. Physicians in the Beard school of thought associated neurasthenia with the stresses of urbanization and with stress suffered as a result of the increasingly competitive business environment. Typically, it was associated with upper class people and with professionals working in sedentary occupations, but really can apply to anyone who lives within the monetary system.

Freud included a variety of physical symptoms into this category, including fatigue, dyspepsia with flatulence, and indications of intra-cranial pressure and spinal irritation. In common with some other people of the time, he believed this condition to be due to "non-completed coitus" or the non-completion of the higher cultural correlate thereof, or to  "infrequency of emissions" or the infrequent practice of the higher cultural correlate thereof. Later, Freud formulated that in cases of coitus interruptus as well as in cases of masturbation, there was "an insufficient libidinal discharge" that had a poisoning effect on the organism, in other words, neurasthenia was the result of (auto)intoxication. Eventually he separated it from anxiety neurosis, though he believed that a combination of the two conditions existed in many cases.

In 19th-century Britain and, by extension, across the British Empire, neurasthenia was also used to describe mental exhaustion or fatigue in “brain workers” or in the context of “overstudy”. This use was often synonymous with the term “brain fag”.

Diagnosis
From 1869, neurasthenia became a "popular" diagnosis, expanding to include such symptoms as weakness, dizziness and fainting.  A common treatment promoted by neurologist S. Weir Mitchell was the rest cure, especially for women. Data from this period gleaned from the Annual Reports of Queen Square Hospital, London, indicates that the diagnosis was balanced between the sexes and had a presence within Europe. Virginia Woolf was known to have been forced to have rest cures, which she describes in her book On Being Ill. Charlotte Perkins Gilman's protagonist in The Yellow Wallpaper also suffers under the auspices of rest cure doctors, much as Gilman herself did. Marcel Proust was said to suffer from neurasthenia. To capitalize on this epidemic, the Rexall drug company introduced a medication called 'Americanitis Elixir' which claimed to be a soother for any bouts related to neurasthenia.

Treatment
Beard, with his partner A.D. Rockwell, advocated first electrotherapy and then increasingly experimental treatments for people with neurasthenia, a position that was controversial. An 1868 review posited that Beard's and Rockwell's knowledge of the scientific method was suspect and did not believe their claims to be warranted.

William James was diagnosed with neurasthenia, which he nicknamed 'Americanitis', and was quoted as saying, "I take it that no man is educated who has never dallied with the thought of suicide."

In 1895, Sigmund Freud reviewed electrotherapy and declared it a "pretense treatment." He emphasized the example of Elizabeth von R's note that "the stronger these were the more they seemed to push her own pains into the background."

Nevertheless, neurasthenia was a common diagnosis during World War I for "shell shock", but its use declined a decade later. Soldiers who deserted their post could be executed even if they had a medical excuse, but officers who had neurasthenia were not executed.

Current opinion
This concept remained popular well into the 20th century, eventually coming to be seen as a behavioural rather than physical condition. Neurasthenia has largely been abandoned as a medical diagnosis.

The ICD-10 system of the World Health Organization categorizes neurasthenia under "F48 – Other neurotic disorders". Under "F48.0 Neurasthenia", there are notable differences in characteristics of the disorder among various cultures. Two main overlapping forms of symptoms can be present: Increased fatigue after mental exertion can be associated with a reduction in cognitive function. Minimal physical effort might be felt as extreme fatigue along with pain and anxiety. Many other symptoms of bodily discomfort may be felt with either form. Excluded from this disorder are: asthenia NOS (R53), burn-out (Z73.0), malaise and fatigue (R53), postviral fatigue syndrome (includes Myalgic encephalomyelitis/Chronic fatigue syndrome (ME/CFS)) (G93.3) and psychasthenia (F48.8).  

One modern opinion of neurasthenia is that it was actually dysautonomia, an "imbalance" of the autonomic nervous system.

Barbara Ehrenreich, restating James's view, considered that neurasthenia was caused by the Calvinist gloom, and it was helped by the New Thought, through replacing the "puritanical 'demand for perpetual effort and self-examination to the point of self-loathing'" with a more hopeful faith.

In Asia
The medical term neurasthenia is translated as Chinese shenjing shuairuo or Japanese shinkei-suijaku (神経衰弱), both of which also translate the common term nervous breakdown. This loanword combines shenjing (神經) or shinkei (神経)  "nerve(s); nervous" and shuairuo or suijaku (衰弱) "weakness; feebleness; debility; asthenia".

Despite being omitted by the American Psychiatric Association's DSM in 1980, neurasthenia is listed in an appendix as the culture-bound syndrome shenjing shuairuo as well as appearing in the ICD-10.  The condition is thought to persist in Asia as a culturally acceptable diagnosis that avoids the social stigma of a diagnosis of mental disorder.

In Japan, shinkei-suijaku is treated with Morita therapy involving mandatory rest and isolation, followed by progressively more difficult work, and a resumption of a previous social role. The diagnosis is sometimes used as a disguise for serious mental illnesses such as schizophrenia and mood disorders.

In China, traditional Chinese medicine describes shenjingshuairuo as a depletion of qi "vital energy" and reduction of functioning in the  wuzang "five internal organs" (heart, liver, spleen, lungs, kidneys). The modern CCMD classifies it as a persistent mental disorder diagnosed with three of these five symptoms: "'weakness' symptoms, 'emotional' symptoms, 'excitement' symptoms, tension-induced pain, and sleep disturbances" not caused by other conditions. Arthur Kleinman described Chinese neurasthenia as a "biculturally patterned illness experience (a special form of somatization), related to depression or other diseases or to culturally sanctioned idioms of distress and psychosocial coping."

See also
 Burnout syndrome
 Chronic fatigue syndrome (ME/CFS)
 Combat stress reaction
 Newyorkitis
 Placebo effect
 Psychogenic disease

References

Further reading
 
 
 Gosling, F. G. Before Freud: Neurasthenia and the American Medical Community, 1870-1910. Urbana: University of Illinois Press, 1987.
 
 
 Schuster, David G. Neurasthenic Nation: America's Search for Health, Comfort, and Happiness, 1869-1920.  New Brunswick, NJ: Rutgers University Press, 2011.
 Lutz, Tom. American Nervousness, 1903. Ithaca, NY: Cornell University Press, 1991.

External links 

Anxiety disorders
Neurological disorders
Military psychiatry
Obsolete terms for mental disorders